Thomas White (1532/34–1558) was an English politician.

He was a Member (MP) of the Parliament of England for Downton in 1555 and 1558.

White studied at the Inner Temple. He was survived by his son, the MP for Clitheroe, John White.

References

1530s births
1558 deaths
Members of the Inner Temple
English MPs 1555
English MPs 1558